The Tripoli District is a small, but very densely populated district in the North Governorate of Lebanon. It consists of the city Tripoli, its port town El Mina and the surrounding area. The vast majority of residents are Sunni Muslim (approximately 80%), a small minority Orthodox and Maronite Christians, and a small minority of Alawite Muslims.

Municipalities
 Al-Qalamoun
 el-Mina
 Tripoli
 Baddawi

Denominational makeup of the population  
By registed voters in the district.

References

 
Districts of Lebanon